Gabriela Servilia Jiménez Ramirez (born 19 August 1976) is a Venezuelan biologist and politician. She has been the Minister of Science and Technology since 6 June 2019.

References 

Living people
1976 births
21st-century Venezuelan politicians
21st-century Venezuelan women politicians
Women government ministers of Venezuela
Venezuelan biologists
Venezuelan women scientists
Venezuelan Ministers of Science
Venezuelan Ministers of Technology